Mar George Garmo (8 December 1921 – 9 September 1999) was the Archbishop of the Chaldean Catholic Archeparchy of Mosul  (Mausiliensis Chaldaeorum) in Iraq from 14 September 1980 until his death on 9 September 1999.

Biography
He was born Georges Francis Garmo in 1921 in Tel Keppe near Mosul, Iraq to a Chaldean Catholic Assyrian family. He entered the Chaldean Patriarchal Seminary in 1934. In 1939, he went to Rome to further his studies. He was ordained a priest there on his 24th birthday, 8 December 1945.  He received a PhD in Divinity and a master's degree in Philosophy from the Pontifical Urbaniana University in Rome.

Mission in  Patriarchate Seminary In Iraq

During this time there was a scarcity of educated Catholic priests in Iraq.  As Rev. Garmo was studying to receive a Ph.D in philosophy, he was requested by the Patriarchate to return to Iraq to minister to the growing Chaldean Patriarchal Seminary, which at the time lacked an extensive Theology and Philosophy department and staff. Rev. Garmo returned to Iraq in the summer of 1947, where he would spearhead the new and improved Philosophy and Theological studies at Chaldean Patriarchal Seminary the following year.

Following his first year as a teacher, in 1949 he was elevated to rector of the Seminary, in which capacity he served until September 1960. During his tenure as Seminary Rector, Garmo was assisted by Patriarch Mar Raphael Bidawid before his elevation to the Patriarchate.

Mission In USA

Patriarch Mar Paul II Cheikho appointed Garmo as pastor of Mother of God Parish in Southfield, Michigan.

In 1964, while serving as pastor of Mother of God Church, Garmo began fundraising drives, with the help of the Parishioners and Parish council he was able to purchase a  plot of land in Southfield on Telegraph Road. Mother of God Cathedral still stands on this property today. In 1964, Garmo was transferred back to Baghdad to serve for two years before he returned to Southfield. On 27 September 1966, Garmo was again appointed Pastor of Mother of God Church and Jacob Yasso Associate Pastor.

Under Garmo's supervision as Pastor of Mother of God Church there were many significant milestones for the Parish and the Chaldean community. In July 1972, the community celebrated the groundbreaking of a newly built Mother of God Parish, as well as a social hall that was dedicated by Patriarch March  Paul II Cheikho on 15 May 1973. In September 1976, a convent for the Chaldean Sisters was opened on the church's property. Also, while serving as Pastor for Mother of God Church on September 1977, Garmo received Sarhad Yawsip Jammo as an Associate Pastor, who later be named the first bishop of the St. Peter the Apostle Diocese in the U.S.

On 25 April 1979, he began building a new and larger Mother of God Church adjacent to the still standing church which would be converted to the present church's rectory. The new church was completed and dedicated on 13 September 1980 by Patriarch March Paul II Cheiko.

Archbishop of Mosul
On 14 September 1980, Garmo was consecrated Archbishop of Mosul by the Chaldean Patriarch. He served as Archbishop of Mosul until 9 September 1999, when he died of cancer, aged 78.

Episcopal lineage

Archbishop George Garmo was co-consecrated by Mar Raphaël I Bidawid and
Bishop Abdul-Ahad Sana.

Archbishop George Garmo was the Principal Co-Consecrator of: Archbishop Stéphane Katchou, Bishop Ibrahim Namo Ibrahim, Bishop Youssef Ibrahim Sarraf, and Archbishop Jibrail Kassab.

References

External links
Eparchy of St. Peter the Apostle website 
Catholic Hierarchy.org

Chaldean archbishops
Iraqi archbishops
1921 births
1999 deaths
People from Tel Keppe
Iraqi Eastern Catholics
Iraqi Assyrian people
Deaths from cancer in Iraq